Molecular Microbiology is a bimonthly peer-reviewed scientific journal covering all aspects of molecular microbiology. It was established in 1987 and is published by Wiley-Blackwell. The editor-in-chief is John D. Helmann (Cornell University).

Abstracting and indexing 
The journal is abstracted and indexed in:

According to the Journal Citation Reports, the journal has a 2017 impact factor of 3.816, ranking it 35th out 125 journals in the category "Microbiology".

References

External links 
 

Publications established in 1987
Microbiology journals
Wiley-Blackwell academic journals
Biweekly journals
English-language journals